Fatakeshto is a series of Indian action films, directed by Swapan Saha. The first film MLA Fatakeshto released in 2006, and the second film Minister Fatakeshto released in 2007.

Overview

MLA Fatakeshto (2006)

Minister Fatakeshto (2007)

Cast and characters

Crew

Influence
The first film MLA Fatakeshto is famous for introducing the dialogue "Marbo ekhane, lash porbe sashane" (I will hit here and the body will be there at the graveyard).

Accolades

References

External links
 
 

Bengali-language films
Indian film series
Action film series